The Baltic Defence College (BALTDEFCOL) is a multinational military college, established by the three Baltic states (Estonia, Latvia and Lithuania) in 1999. It serves as a centre of strategic and operational research and provides professional military education to intermediate- and senior-level officers and government officials from the founding states, other member states of the European Union (EU) and the North Atlantic Treaty Organisation (NATO) countries, as well as other European countries including Armenia, Azerbaijan,  Bosnia and Herzegovina, Georgia, Moldova, Montenegro, Serbia and Ukraine.

Research
The Baltic Defence College hosts roundtable seminars and major conferences annually, including a Cyber Conference and a Conference on Russian 'Power Projection'. The college's academic faculty also engage in personal research, generating a range of different articles, books and commentaries each year.

Commandants

Deans

The dean between 2004 and 2008 was Tomas Jermalavicius – a Lithuanian researcher of strategic resiliency.

Controversies
In May 2014 Tartu County Court found Baltic Defence College staff members, Finance Officer Jana Lundblad and Chief of Support Lt. Col. Indrek Paul - Rajamäe-Volmer, guilty of misappropriation of funds. They received suspended prison sentences.

Further reading
 James Corum, Art Johanson:  20th Anniversary History Book (pdf, 15 MB)

See also
 Estonian National Defence College
List of universities in Estonia
NATO Defense College
European Security and Defence College
NATO School

References

Educational institutions established in 1999
Military academies of Estonia
Military of Estonia
Military of Latvia
Military of Lithuania
Military projects of the Baltic states
Staff colleges
Education in Tartu
1999 establishments in Estonia
Education in the Baltic states
International military schools